Sulfat is a rural locality (a settlement) in Selenginsky District, Republic of Buryatia, Russia. The population was 18 as of 2010.

Geography 
Sulfat is located 16 km northeast of Gusinoozyorsk (the district's administrative centre) by road. Tokhoy is the nearest rural locality.

References 

Rural localities in Selenginsky District